State Route 95 (SR 95) is an east–west state highway in the central part of the U.S. state of Ohio.  Its western terminus is in LaRue at SR 37 and its eastern terminus is at SR 3 just south of Wooster.

Major intersections

SR 95A
SR 95A is an  alternate route of SR 95 in downtown Mount Gilead.  SR 95 splits at the intersection of High Street and Marion Street in Mount Gilead.  SR 95 runs east through Mount Gilead as High Street while SR 95A runs east through Mount Gilead as Marion Street, just a few blocks south of High Street.  The two routes then intersect again, with Route 95A ending at SR 95 near River Cliff Cemetery.

References

095
Transportation in Marion County, Ohio
Transportation in Morrow County, Ohio
Transportation in Knox County, Ohio
Transportation in Ashland County, Ohio
Transportation in Wayne County, Ohio
Transportation in Richland County, Ohio